The 1998 CONCACAF Gold Cup was the fourth edition of the Gold Cup, the soccer championship of North America, Central America and the Caribbean (CONCACAF).

The tournament was once again held in the United States, in Los Angeles, Miami, and Oakland. The format of the tournament changed from 1996: it was expanded to ten teams, with four in Group A and three each in Groups B and C. The top team in each group, plus the second place in Group A would advance to the semifinals. Brazil was invited again, and brought their senior team this time.

Jamaica, getting ready for the 1998 World Cup, pulled the stunner of the first round. They did not originally qualify for the tournament, but Canada withdrew, granting them a spot. Jamaica then topped Group A over Brazil (they tied the South Americans 0–0). In the semi-finals, the United States beat Brazil, as Preki scored the lone goal and Kasey Keller preserved the clean sheet. The United States could not repeat that performance in front of a pro-Mexican final crowd in Los Angeles. Mexico won their third straight Gold Cup, 1–0, on a Luis Hernández goal.

Qualified teams

Notes:

Qualification play-off

A playoff between Cuba, the runner-up from the 1996 Caribbean Cup and Saint Kitts and Nevis, the runner-up from the 1997 Caribbean Cup, was held to determine which nation would qualify for the 1998 CONCACAF Gold Cup.

Venues

Squads

The 10 national teams involved in the tournament were required to register a squad of 20 players; only players in these squads were eligible to take part in the tournament.

Group stage

Group A

Group B

Group C

Knockout stage

Bracket

Semi-finals

Third place match

Final

Statistics

Goalscorers
4 goals

 Paulo Wanchope
 Luis Hernández

3 goals
 Romário

2 goals

 Giovane Élber
 Juan Carlos Plata
 Paul Hall
 Cuauhtémoc Blanco
 Stern John
 Jerren Nixon
 Preki

1 goal

 Edmundo
 Austin Berry (footballer)
 Wilmer López
 Roy Myers
 Allan Oviedo
 Luis Martén
 Eduardo Sebrango
 Edwin Westphal
 Carlos Pavón
 Marcus Gayle
 Fitzroy Simpson
 Andy Williams
 Ramón Ramírez
 Francisco Palencia
 Clint Marcelle
 Joe-Max Moore
 Eddie Pope
 Roy Wegerle
 Eric Wynalda

Awards

Winners

Individual awards

References

External links
 Official tournament results
 1998 CONCACAF Gold Cup at RSSSF

 
Gold Cup
CONCACAF Gold Cup 1998
CONCACAF Gold Cup
CONCACAF Gold Cup tournaments